= Ogarshikha =

- Native name: Огаршиха (Russian)

Location
- Country: Russia
- Region: Perm Krai
- City: Perm

Physical characteristics
- Source
  - coordinates: 58.0097°N 56.3981°E
- Mouth: Bolshaya Motovilikha
  - coordinates: 58.0294°N 56.3436°E
  - elevation: 105 m (344 ft)
- Length: 4.9 km (3.0 mi)
- Basin size: 8.5 km^{2} (3.3 mi^{2})

The Ogarshikha (Russian: Огаршиха) is a river in Perm Krai of Russia. It is a left tributary of the Bolshaya Motovilikha. The Ogarshikha is 4.9 kilometres (3.0 mi) long. It flows over the eastern part of Perm.
